These are the results of the men's team all-around competition, one of eight events for male competitors in artistic gymnastics at the 1968 Summer Olympics in Mexico City.

Competition format

The scoring in all the events was similar to that of the gymnastics events at the 1960 Summer Olympics in Rome, Italy. Six best gymnasts on the apparatus in the team competition (by sum of two scores - for compulsory and optional routine) qualified for that apparatus finals. The new feature of the competition was in women's events: each of them was judged by four judges, like men's ones. The highest and lowest marks were dropped and an average of two remaining marks constituted the score.

Each nation entered a team of six gymnasts. All entrants in the gymnastics competitions performed both a compulsory exercise and a voluntary exercise for each apparatus. The top five individual scores in each exercise (that is, compulsory floor, voluntary floor, compulsory vault, etc.) were added to give a team score for that exercise. The 12 team exercise scores were summed to give a team total.

No separate finals were contested for the team all-around.

Exercise scores ranged from 0 to 10, apparatus scores from 0 to 20, individual totals from 0 to 120, and team scores from 0 to 600.

Results
After Japan won the team gold, Eizo Kenmotsu became the youngest ever Japanese male gymnast to win an Olympic gold medal.  He was 20 years, 8 months and 11 days old, and would hold on to this record for almost 50 years until Kenzo Shirai broke it in 2016, becoming also Japan‘s only teenage male gymnast to do so at this level.

The men's artistic gymnastics all-around team event Olympic final took place on 24 October 1968.

References

External links
Official Olympic Report
www.gymnasticsresults.com
www.gymn-forum.net

Men's artistic team all-around
Men's events at the 1968 Summer Olympics